Edenderry GAA is a Gaelic Athletic Association club based in Edenderry, County Offaly, Ireland. It participates in competitions organised by the Offaly GAA county board. The club fields both Gaelic football and hurling teams.

Paul O'Kelly, who was a selector under Tommy Lyons when the Offaly county team won the 1997 Leinster Senior Football Championship and the 1997–98 National Football League, is from the Edenderry club. O'Kelly later served as manager of the county team himself.

Notable players
 Gerry Carroll
 Finbarr Cullen
 Seán Evans
 Cillian Farrell 
 Seán Foran

Achievements
 Offaly Senior Football Championship (11 titles): 1936, 1951, 1953, 1957, 1985, 1995, 1997, 1999, 2001, 2011, 2015 
 Offaly Senior Hurling Championship (0 titles): Runners-Up 1911, 1913, 1940
 Offaly Intermediate Football Championship (1 title): 2007
 Offaly Intermediate Hurling Championship (3 titles): 1935, 1954, 1963
 Offaly Junior Football Championship (3 titles): 1925, 1933, 1997
 Offaly Junior A Hurling Championship (5 titles): 1929, 1953, 1962, 1998, 2022 
 Offaly Junior B Hurling Championship (1 title): 2020

References

External links
 Edenderry GAA website
 Offaly GAA Roll of Honour

Gaelic games clubs in County Offaly
Gaelic football clubs in County Offaly
Hurling clubs in County Offaly